Nothomastix chromalis is a moth in the family Crambidae. It was described by Francis Walker in 1866. It is found in India (Sikkim) and on Java.

References

Moths described in 1866
Spilomelinae
Moths of Asia
Moths of Indonesia